A facet is a flat surface of a geometric shape, e.g., of a cut gemstone.

Facet may also refer to:

Arts, entertainment, and media
 Facets (album), an album by Jim Croce
 Facets, a 1980 album by jazz pianist Monty Alexander and his trio
 "Facets" (DS9 episode), an episode of Star Trek: Deep Space Nine
 FACETS, a scholarly journal published by Canadian Science Publishing

Biology and healthcare
 Facet (psychology), a component of a personality trait
 Facet, a part of a compound eye
 Facet joint, or zygapophyseal joint, a type (zygapophyseal) of vertebral joint
 FACETS ("Fast Analog Computing with Emerging Transient States"), a neuroscience project

Other uses
 Facet (geometry), the formalization of the same notion
 Facets Multi-Media, a Chicago-area non-profit arts organization
 Facet theory, a metatheory for the behavioral sciences

See also
 Faceted (disambiguation)
 Faceting
 Faceted search